The 2015–16 Virginia Tech Hokies men's basketball team represented Virginia Polytechnic Institute and State University during the 2015–16 NCAA Division I men's basketball season. The Hokies were led by second year head coach Buzz Williams and played their home games at Cassell Coliseum. They were a member of the Atlantic Coast Conference. They finished the season 20–15, 10–8 in ACC play to finish in a tie for seventh place. They defeated Florida State in the second round of the ACC tournament to advance to the quarterfinals where they lost to Miami (FL). They were invited to the National Invitation Tournament where they defeated Princeton in the first round to advance to the second round where they lost to BYU.

Last season
The Hokies finished the 2014–15 season 11–21, 2–16 in ACC play to finish in last place. They advanced to the second round of the ACC tournament where they lost to Miami (FL).

Departures

Incoming transfers

Recruiting class

Roster

Schedule

|-
!colspan=12 style="background:#660000; color:white;"| Non-conference regular season

|-
!colspan=12 style="background:#660000; color:white;"| ACC regular season

|-
!colspan=9 style="background:#660000; color:white;"| ACC tournament

|-
!colspan=9 style="background:#660000; color:white;"| National Invitation tournament

References

Virginia Tech Hokies men's basketball seasons
Virginia Tech
Virginia Tech Hokies men's basketball
Virginia Tech
Virginia Tech